Aaron Molyneaux Hewlett (c. 18201871) was the first African American instructor at Harvard University and oversaw the college's gymnasium. He was the first superintendent of physical education in American higher education. Hewlett was instructor and curator of the College gymnasium from its construction in 1859 until his death in 1871.

Biography 
Hewlett lived in Brooklyn before his job at Harvard. He worked as a porter but also taught boxing and wrestling. The New York Clipper, the leading New York sports paper, considered him "one of the best boxers in Brooklyn." in 1854 he quit his job as a porter and opened “Molineaux House,” a sparring academy, at his residence.

Hewlett's instruction included the use of exercise equipment and clubs in order to strengthen the body. The 1866 portrait of him and his equipment, taken by George Kendall Warren, is the first known photograph of a medicine ball in the United States. After Hewlett had been working at Harvard for ten years, a local Boston paper commented that Harvard's "Athletics have come almost to rank with Mathematics."

Hewlett participated in civic life and stood up for his rights. In addition to his work at Harvard, Hewlett was also partial owner of a clothing and variety store on Brattle Street in Cambridge where he sold gymnastic equipment. When he and his daughter were denied their seats at the Boston Theater in 1866, he petitioned the Commonwealth of Massachusetts to better enforce its own laws and revoke the licenses from establishments that illegally discriminated against African Americans.

Personal life
Hewlett was born in New York, to Isaac and Rachel Hewlett. He married Virginia Josephine (née Lewis) Hewlett, who was also a physical education instructor. They had five children: Virginia Hewlett Douglass, a suffragist who married Frederick Douglass Jr.; Emanuel D. Molyneaux Hewlett, who became the first black graduate of the Boston University School of Law; Aaron; Paul Molyneaux, who became a renowned Shakesperian actor; and Aaronella.

The New York Times published an editorial in 1916 about the "boxing revival" of the time at Harvard, mentioning Hewlettdeceased for over forty yearsas a prize fighter and a "midnight Mars" who came to Harvard from "the traditions of the ring." Emanuel Molyneaux called the editorial "uncomplimentary" and denied that his father had been a prize fighter.

References

1820s births
1871 deaths
Harvard University people
American male boxers
Sportspeople from Brooklyn
American exercise instructors
Harvard Crimson coaches
Boxers from New York City